Qarajeh may refer to various places in Iran:
 Qarajeh, Heris, East Azerbaijan Province
 Qarajeh, Meyaneh, East Azerbaijan Province
 Qarajeh-ye Feyzollah, East Azerbaijan Province
 Qarajeh Malek, East Azerbaijan Province
 Qarajeh-ye Mohammad, East Azerbaijan Province
 Qarajeh, North Khorasan